Statistics of the Stirling & District AFA in season 2013–14.  Bonnybridge AFC won the Premier Division

Stirling & District AFA Premier Division

Stirling & District AFA Division One

Stirling & District AFA Division Two

Stirling & District AFA Division Three

See also
2013–14 in Scottish football

References

Football in Stirling (council area)
2013–14 in Scottish football